Thomas Frazer (August 8, 1821 in Lortny, Scotland – March 16, 1904 in Beaver, Utah) was an American mason known for his work in Beaver, Utah.  Born in Lortny, Scotland, he created many works that are listed on the U.S. National Register of Historic Places.

Early history
Thomas Frazer was born in 1821, 25 miles northwest of Dundee, Scotland in the small mill town of Lortny.  After a stint as a worker in a weaving factory, Frazer became a stonemason, working with a gang of masons on a number of construction projects.  He married in 1861 at the age of 40, and moved in that year with his new bride to the Utah Territory in the United States to join the Church of Jesus Christ of Latter-day Saints.  He worked on the new temple in Salt Lake City, and was then sent to help settle the town of Lehi, Utah.  This was a town that primarily used adobe as its main building material, and was unlikely to have appealed to the stonemason.  After seven years there, he was given the opportunity to direct a building project in Beaver, Utah, 150 miles southwest of Lehi.

Beaver
Frazer arrived in 1868 and started work on industrial structures, none of which remain. He built almost exclusively with basalt at that time, a black or grey rock available in the local hills.  Basalt is a hard volcanic rock, it weathers very well, but is somewhat difficult to cut. Frazer and his masons split and chiseled the stone, making a roughly squared face. These blocks were set in courses on the building facades that faced the streets. The blocks were then finished around the edges with black-dyed mortar and joined by a white mortar joint, giving a squared look to the slightly irregular edges.  The dressed stone, known as Ashlar masonry, was used only for the outer shell of the stone walls, the rest of the wall was made of infilled rubble stone, forming a wall with a total thickness of about 18 inches.  After a quarry for volcanic tuff, also known as pink rock, opened in 1881, Frazer switched to that softer, easier to work material.

Thomas Frazer became the most prolific stonemason in Beaver, and was the only builder in town to make a full-time living from construction.  Though most of his non-residential buildings have been removed or replaced in the 20th century, many houses remain.

He died March 16, 1904.

Works
Works (credits) include:
Joseph Bohn House, 355 S. 200 West, Beaver, UT (Frazer,Thomas) NRHP-listed
Julia P. M. Farnsworth Barn, 180 W. Center St. (rear), Beaver, UT (Frazer,Thomas) NRHP-listed
Julia Farnsworth House, 180 W. Center St., Beaver, UT (Frazer,Thomas) NRHP-listed
David L. Frazer House, 817 E. 200 North, Beaver, UT (Frazer,Thomas & David Ingles) NRHP-listed
Thomas Frazer House, 590 N. 300 West, Beaver, UT (Frazer,Thomas) NRHP-listed
Duckworth Grimshaw House, 95 N. 400 West, Beaver, UT (Frazer,Thomas) NRHP-listed
Thomas Jones House, 635 N. 400 West, Beaver, UT (Frazer,Thomas) NRHP-listed
Mathew McEvan House, 205 N. 100 West, Beaver, UT (Frazer,Thomas) NRHP-listed
David Powell House, 115 N. 400 West, Beaver, UT (Frazer,Thomas) NRHP-listed
School House, 325 N. 200 West, Beaver, UT (Frazer,Thomas) NRHP-listed
Robert Stoney House, 295 N. 400 West, Beaver, UT (Frazer,Thomas) NRHP-listed
Joseph Tattersall House, 195 N. 400 West, Beaver, UT (Frazer,Thomas) NRHP-listed
William Thompson, Jr., House, 10 W. 400 North, Beaver, UT (Frazer,Thomas) NRHP-listed
Edward Tolton House, 210 W. 400 North, Beaver, UT (Frazer,Thomas) NRHP-listed
Charles Dennis White House, 115 E. 400 North St., Beaver, UT (Frazer,Thomas) NRHP-listed
Charles Willden House, 180 E. 300 South, Beaver, UT (Frazer,Thomas) NRHP-listed

References

1821 births
1904 deaths
Scottish Latter Day Saints
Scottish emigrants to the United States
19th-century American architects
19th-century Scottish architects
People from Blairgowrie and Rattray
People from Beaver, Utah